CFL Class 2200 is a series of electric multiple units built by Alstom for CFL. The trains are similar to the French SNCF Class Z 26500.

In 2006, EMU 2207 collided head-on with a freight train in the Zoufftgen train collision, resulting in 6 deaths. Damaged parts of the train were removed and replaced by new sections. This train was renumbered into 2223.

Interior

References

External links 
 Series 2200 on rail.lu 

2200
Train-related introductions in 2004

25 kV AC multiple units
1500 V DC multiple units of France
Alstom multiple units